Evetts is a surname. Notable people with the surname include:

Deborah Evetts, English-born American fine bookbinder, and book conservator
Hayley Evetts (born 1976), English singer, television presenter and stage actor
John Fullerton Evetts (1891–1988), British Army officer
Julian Evetts (1911–1996), English cricketer
Steve Evetts, American record producer
Ted Evetts (born 1997), English darts player
William Evetts (1847–1936), English cricketer